Ă (upper case) or ă (lower case), usually referred to in English as A-breve, is a letter used in standard Romanian and Vietnamese orthographies.  In Romanian, it is used to represent the mid-central unrounded vowel, while in Vietnamese it represents the short a sound. It is the second letter of the Romanian, Vietnamese, and the pre-1972 Malaysian alphabets, after A.

Ă/ă is also used in several languages for transliteration of Bulgarian letter Ъ/ъ.

Romanian
The sound represented in Romanian by ă is a mid-central vowel , i.e. schwa. Unlike in English, Catalan and French but like in Indonesian (using ā (a with macron) rather than ă), the vowel can be stressed. There are words in which it is the only vowel, such as măr  ("apple") or văd  ("I see"). Additionally, some words that also contain other vowels can have the stress on ă like cărțile  ("the books") and odăi  ("rooms").

Vietnamese
Ă is the 2nd letter of the Vietnamese alphabet and represents . Because Vietnamese is a tonal language this letter may have any one of the 5 tonal symbols above or below it (or even no accent at all, since the Vietnamese first tone is identified by the lack of accent marks).  See Vietnamese phonology.
 Ằ ằ
 Ắ ắ
 Ẳ ẳ
 Ẵ ẵ
 Ặ ặ

Malay
The sound represented in pre-1972 Malaysian orthography by ă is a vowel. It occurred in the final syllable of the root word such as lamă  ("long", "old"), mată  ("eye"), and sană  ("there"). The letter was replaced in 1972 with a in the New Rumi Spelling.

Khmer
Ă or ă are used in Khmer romanization, e.g. Preăh Réachéanachăk Kămpŭchéa (Kingdom of Cambodia).

Pronunciation respelling for English

In some systems for Pronunciation respelling for English including American Heritage Dictionary notation, ă represents the short A sound, .

Character mappings

See also

 A with breve (Cyrillic), Cyrillic letter а with breve, visually indistinguishable
 Breve

References

Phonetic transcription symbols
Latin letters with diacritics